was a Japanese actor and voice actor from Nagoya, Aichi Prefecture who was affiliated with Gekidan 21 Seiki Fox at the time of his death. He was previously affiliated with Ken Production.

Filmography

Anime
Carlos in Cowboy Bebop
Lemint in Fushigiboshi no Futagohime
Kojiro Murdoch & Tad Elsman in Gundam Seed
Hachiemon, Rikichi in Inuyasha
Clyde in Outlaw Star
Masami Hirukawa in Paranoia Agent
Montand in Princess Tutu
Da Ruma in Tenchi Muyo! GXP
Paul in Di Gi Charat Nyo!
Landbullet in Transformers: Galaxy Force
Chief Nagase in ToHeart Remember my Memories
Yagi-chan in Hajime no Ippo
Tome-san in Detective Conan
Farmer Brown and the Yamato no Orochi in Ranma ½
Doctor (ep5) in Rumiko Takahashi Anthology
Customer 1, Kohran's Father, Man, Operator A, Police Officer B & Supervisor in Sakura Wars
Movie Orator in Sakura Wars OVA
Wise Men Staff in Sakura Wars: The Movie

Films
Hachiemon in Inuyasha the Movie: Affections Touching Across Time
Hachiemon in Inuyasha the Movie: The Castle Beyond the Looking Glass
Wanton in Ranma ½: Battle at Togenkyo! Get Back the Brides

Dubbing
Captain America (Lieutenant Colonel Louis (Michael Nouri))

Sound director
Blade
Chaos Head
Infinite Stratos
Kanokon
Kobato.
RideBack
Sands of Destruction

References

External links
Toshihiko Nakajima at IMDB
Toshihiko Nakajima at Ryu's Seiyuu Infos

1962 births
2017 deaths
Male voice actors from Nagoya
Japanese male voice actors
Japanese voice directors
Ken Production voice actors